A Lion in Town (Swedish: Lejon på stan) is a 1959 Swedish comedy film directed by Gösta Folke and starring Nils Poppe, Ann-Marie Gyllenspetz and Herman Ahlsell. It was shot at the Råsunda Studios in Stockholm. The film's sets were designed by the art director Rolf Boman.

Cast
 Nils Poppe as 	Charlie
 Ann-Marie Gyllenspetz as 	Greta Berg
 Herman Ahlsell as	Carl-Adam Pettersson
 Jan-Erik Lindqvist as 	Valdemar 'Walle' Blom
 Sigge Fürst as Supt. Vogel
 Olof Thunberg as 	Mayor
 Git Gay as 	Astrid Johansson
 Hugo Björne as 	Editor
 Åke Fridell as 	Circus Director	
 Toivo Pawlo as 	Barker
 Hilding Rolin as	Morelli 
 Gunnar Olsson as 	Pawn Broker
 Ragnar Arvedson as 	Nisse aka Fakir Ali Akbar
 Curt Löwgren as 	Roffe 
 Gösta Prüzelius as 	Police Officer
 Gunnar Nielsen as 	Police Officer	
 Peter Thelin as 	Janne
 John Norrman as 	Fisherman 
 Mona Geijer-Falkner as Sales Woman 
 Sven Holmberg as Police Officer 
 Svea Holst as 	Sales Woman
 Dagny Lind as 	Burgomaster's Wife

References

Bibliography 
 Qvist, Per Olov & von Bagh, Peter. Guide to the Cinema of Sweden and Finland. Greenwood Publishing Group, 2000.

External links 
 

1959 films
Swedish comedy films
1959 comedy films
1950s Swedish-language films
Films directed by Gösta Folke
Swedish black-and-white films
1950s Swedish films